Crawford William Fairbrother  (1 December 1936 – 23 November 1986) was a Scottish high jumper. Born in Paisley, Renfrewshire, Scotland, his father was Scottish Athletics Championship medallist in high jump in the 1920s and 1930s.

Fairbrother won a record 13 successive Scottish titles in the high jump from 1957 to 1969, the best post-war championship record by any Scot. He also won the AAA Championship titles in 1959, 1961 and 1964.

Fairbrother first competed internationally at the 1958 British Empire and Commonwealth Games in Cardiff, Wales. One month later at the 1958 European Athletics Championships in Stockholm, Sweden, Fairbrother, representing Great Britain in the high jump, finished tenth in the final clearing . Two years later at the 1962 European Athletics Championships in Belgrade, Yugoslavia, Fairbrother in the high jump cleared . At his final international meet, the 1970 British Commonwealth Games in Edinburgh, Fairbrother took the oath of behalf of the competitors at the opening ceremony. The following day in the high jump, Fairbrother failed to make the final.

He represented Britain on a record 53 occasions and placed in the top three 35 times. He set three United Kingdom and five Scottish records, the best being  set in September 1964, a mark which stood until 1975.

Fairbrother died on 23 November 1986 in his hometown Paisley, eight days short of his 50th birthday. He survived by his wife Rena, daughter Karen and son Kenneth. A service was held on 26 November 1986 at St. John's Church, Paisley and he was cremated during a private service.

References

1936 births
1986 deaths
Sportspeople from Paisley, Renfrewshire
Scottish male high jumpers
Members of the Order of the British Empire
Olympic athletes of Great Britain
Commonwealth Games competitors for Scotland
Athletes (track and field) at the 1960 Summer Olympics
Athletes (track and field) at the 1958 British Empire and Commonwealth Games
Athletes (track and field) at the 1962 British Empire and Commonwealth Games
Athletes (track and field) at the 1966 British Empire and Commonwealth Games
Athletes (track and field) at the 1970 British Commonwealth Games